Key to My Life: The Collection is the third compilation album released by Irish boyband Boyzone. The album contains material recorded between 1994 and 1999, and was released on 30 January 2006 by Universal.

Track listing
 "Key to My Life" - 3:44
 "Will Be Yours" - 3:37
 "Love Me for a Reason" - 3:38
 "One Kiss at a Time" - 4:05
 "This Is Where I Belong" - 5:25
 "No Matter What" - 4:33
 "I'm Learning" - 3:41
 "So Good" - 3:02
 "Can't Stop Me" - 3:03
 "Believe in Me" - 3:44
 "While the World Is Going Crazy" - 5:09
 "When the Going Gets Tough" - 3:36
 "When All Is Said & Done" - 3:04
 "You Needed Me" - 3:30

Credits

Boyzone – Vocals
Mike Mangini – Guitar, Producer
James McNally – Accordion, Whistle
Ann Morfee – Violin
Steve Morris – Violin
Tessa Niles – Background Vocals
Graeme Perkins – Organizer
Audrey Riley – Cello
Trevor Steel – Programming, Producer
Miriam Stockley – Background Vocals
Carl Sturken – Arranger, Producer
Philip Todd – Saxophone
Peter-John Vettese – Keyboards
Warren Wiebe – Background Vocals
Gavyn Wright – String Director
Nigel Wright – Keyboards, Producer
Guy Baker – Trumpet
Clare Finnimore – Viola
Matt Howe – Mix engineer
Gillian Kent – Violin
Michael Hart Thompson – Guitar
Jeremy Wheatley – Mix engineer
Andy Caine – Background Vocals
Clare Thompson – Violin
Bruce White – Viola
John Matthews – Background Vocals
Andy Earl – Photography
Alex Black – Assistant Engineer
Tim Willis – Assistant Engineer
Ben Allen – Guitar
John R. Angier – Keyboards
Emma Black – Cello
Deborah Widdup – Violin
Nastee – DJ
Anna Hemery – Violin
Wayne Hector – Background Vocals, Vocal Arrangement
Yvonne John Lewis – Background Vocals
Absolute – Producer, Mix engineer
Richard George – Violin
Skoti-Alain Elliot – Bass, Programming, Track Engineer
Laura Melhuish – Violin
Orla Quirke – Design, Direction
Jim Steinman – Producer, Executive Producer
Paul Martin – Viola
Tracie Ackerman – Background Vocals
Tom Lord-Alge – Mix engineer
Andy Bradfield – Remixing
Nick Cooper – Cello
Ian Curnow – Producer
Danny G. – Keyboards
Sue Dench – Viola
Andy Duncan – Drums
Simon Franglen – Keyboards, Engineer, Programming
Scott Gordon – Vocal Engineer
Mark Hudson – Vocal Arrangement, Vocal Producer
Eric Lijestrand – Digital Editing
Steve Lipson – Bass, Producer, Programming, Mandolin

Certifications

Notes

2006 greatest hits albums
Boyzone albums
Universal Records compilation albums